Nysius niger is a species of true bug in the family Lygaeidae. It is a pest of millets in the Americas.

References

niger
Insect pests of millets